Full Circle, released in the USA as The Haunting of Julia, is a 1977 supernatural horror film directed by Richard Loncraine, and starring Mia Farrow and Keir Dullea. Based on the novel Julia by Peter Straub, it is the first film realization of one of his books, and follows a woman who, after the death of her daughter, finds herself haunted by the vengeful ghost of a young girl in her new home.

A co-production between Canada and the United Kingdom, the film was shot in London, and first released under the title Full Circle, opening at the San Sebastián International Film Festival in September 1977. It was subsequently released theatrically in England and Canada in May 1978. The film went unreleased in the United States until May 1981, when it was given theatrical distribution through Cinema International Corporation.

The film received mixed reviews from critics at the time of its release, with some praising its atmosphere and performances, while others deemed it either predictable or too plodding.

Plot
Julia Lofting, an American housewife living in London, inadvertently kills her daughter, Kate, while performing a botched tracheotomy after Kate begins choking during breakfast one morning. Kate's death traumatizes Julia, and she soon separates from her husband, Magnus, and rents a large, fully-furnished house in Holland Park. In the house, Julia finds a second-floor room containing a child's possessions. Shortly after moving in, Julia begins to suspect Magnus is breaking into the house. In the park, she sees a young girl that she believes is Kate, but the child disappears. Unusual things take place in the house such as strange noises and appliances turning on by themselves. Later, Julia again sees the girl in the park and finds a mutilated turtle and knife where she stood.

Lonely, Julia holds a gathering of friends at her new home, including Magnus' sister, Lily. Lily brings with her Mrs. Flood, a psychic medium who suggests that they conduct a séance. Julia is hesitant, but agrees to participate. During the séance, Mrs. Flood becomes frightened and tells Julia to leave the house immediately. Moments later, one of Lily's friends falls down the stairs before Mrs. Flood can explain what she saw. Later, Julia is informed by Mrs. Flood that she had a vision of a boy bleeding to death in the park.

The next day, while Julia is out, Magnus breaks into her house. He sees something and follows it to the basement where he falls from the staircase, fatally cutting his throat on a broken mirror. Meanwhile, Julia, curious about the home's prior residents, learns from a neighbor that it once belonged to Heather Rudge, who sold the property after her daughter Olivia died. Upon further investigation, Julia discovers an article about Geoffrey Braden, a young boy who was murdered in the park in the 1940s. Julia visits Geoffrey's mother, Greta, who says a vagrant was executed for the crime but that she believes it was children in the park who murdered her son. Greta claims his murder was a hate crime motivated by the fact that Geoffrey was German. She says she has followed the lives of the children who were in the park with Geoffrey that day, and asks Julia to visit the remaining two, now adults: Captain Paul Winter and David Swift.

First, Julia visits Winter, but when she mentions Geoffrey, he forcefully tells her to leave. She then visits Swift, an alcoholic who explains that Olivia had a sadistic power over him and the other children: He tells Julia that Olivia taught them about sex, and made each of them perform a ritual killing of an animal. Swift recounts Geoffrey's murder, which was orchestrated by Olivia: She forced the other boys to hold him down while she shoved grass and clumps of dirt down his throat and then smothered him with a coat. After he was dead, Olivia used a penknife to castrate him. Shortly after Julia departs Swift's apartment, he slips on a broken bottle in the stairwell and falls to his death. Meanwhile, Julia tells her friend Mark, an antiques dealer, what she has discovered but he does not believe her. That evening, he is electrocuted by a lamp falling into his bath.

Julia visits Olivia's mother, Heather, in a psychiatric home. Heather confesses that she strangled Olivia to death after learning of Geoffrey's murder, and insists that Olivia was inherently evil. As Julia leaves she looks over her shoulder at Heather, who glimpses Olivia's eyes and dies of a fright-induced heart attack. Julia returns home, where she witnesses Olivia's apparition, first in the bathroom mirror and then in the living room playing with Kate's beloved cymbal-banging clown toy. Julia takes the toy from Olivia, offers her a hug, and asks her to stay. She proceeds to embrace Olivia, only to have her throat slashed by the sharp edges of the toy. Collapsing onto a lounge chair, Julia bleeds to death.

Cast

Analysis
Film scholar Barbara Creed considers Full Circle an example of numerous supernatural horror films that utilize ghost children as a means of exploring humans' relationships to death, particularly the "dual (earthly/spiritual) nature of the little girl, and her propensity for entering other worlds...  [the film] presents a mother-daughter bond as particularly conducive to ghosts and haunting." Writer Kim Newman compares the film to Nicolas Roeg's Don't Look Now (1973) due to its shared themes of the supernatural and the grief of losing a child, which unwittingly leads a mourning parent to their own demise.

Production
Filming of Full Circle took place in London between November and December 1976. Actress Mia Farrow shot the film whilst also performing in a stage production of Ivanov by the Royal Shakespeare Company.

Release
Full Circle premiered at the San Sebastián International Film Festival on 11 September 1977 and at the Avoriaz Film Festival in France in 1978. The film opened in London on 4 May 1978 and in Canada on 19 May 1978. The film also received theatrical release in Hong Kong in the fall of 1980.

In the United States, the film was released under the title  The Haunting of Julia, opening in Washington, D.C. on 6 February 1981 before premiering in New York City on 29 May 1981. It subsequently opened in San Francisco on 1 July 1981, and later screened in Boston beginning 2 October 1981. In the United States, the film still failed to find an audience.

Critical response
Following the film's premiere at the San Sebastian Film Festival, The Guardian noted: "Some of the technical work is first-class, as are many of the supporting performances (you'll either like or hate Mia Farrow according to taste). But the film would have been more interesting as a proper study of a woman "under the influence" than it is a slightly more derivative tale of evil working from beyond the grave." Film critic Derek Malcolm, writing after the film's May 1978 release in the United Kingdom, praised Farrow's performance, as well as the film's cinematography and atmosphere, summarizing that the film "is well worth seeing, even if it does suffer from those two well-known British cinematic deficiencies—lack of a really clear purpose and the narrative drive to go with it." Tom Milne of The Observer alternately felt the film was predictable, and that director Loncraine's "piling on the emptily brooding stylistics does little to help matters."

Elizabeth Smith of the Montreal Gazette praised Farrow's performance as "harrowing," adding that "the tension is strong throughout, never a let-up or a breather...  you'll leave the movie drained of emotion. It's a terrifying film." Variety noted that the film "has a fairly tight script which, in first half at least, builds up scary tensions nicely. There's a performance by Mia Farrow which is somewhat reminiscent of Rosemary's Baby, and enough supernatural trappings to please those who are fascinated by the occult." Ernest Leogrande of the New York Daily News gave the film a one-and-a-half-star rating out of four, writing that it "seems to be structured around the themes of expiation and forgiveness... [but] it's hard to get interested in the fate of the pallid Julia."

Janet Maslin of The New York Times was unimpressed by the film, writing that it "manages to draw on every horror movie cliche imaginable and still make very little sense...  As directed by Richard Loncraine, The Haunting of Julia is virtually scareless, and the camera angles provide advance tipoffs to the few frightening episodes that punctuate the dull ones." The Washington Posts Judith Martin gave the film a similarly unfavorable review, writing that the opening scene "has more of the real essence of horror to it than any number of walks down dark passages to the accompaniment of jangly background music. Unfortunately, after this one fresh approach, the film turns to dark, noisy walks," concluding that it "lacks the psychological logic of a good ghost story."

In his book Uneasy Dreams: The Golden Age of British Horror Films, 1956-1976 (2010), Gary A Smith describes the film as a "dark and depressing "arthouse" horror film." Conversely, Jonathan Rigby, in English Gothic (2000), discusses the various Anglo-Canadian co-productions of the period, saying that "Much the best of these offerings is Richard Loncraine's quietly disturbing Full Circle", noting also that "Loncraine makes the most of memorable cameos from fine character actors", and concluding that "the elegiac atmosphere Loncraine conjures up ... is almost tangible."

Home media
Media Home Entertainment released the film on VHS in the United States in 1981 under The Haunting of Julia title. It was re-released on VHS in 1988 by Magnum Entertainment. 

In January 2023, the Australian label Imprint Films announced they were releasing a limited edition Blu-ray edition of the film, along with its original musical score on CD, on 26 April 2023. The American distributor Scream Factory subsequently announced a 4K UHD Blu-ray edition due for release on 18 April 2023, while the British Film Institute announced a 4K UHD Blu-ray scheduled for release in the United Kingdom on 24 April 2023. The french distributor Le Chat qui Fume announced in January 2023 a 4K UHD Blu-ray edition due for release on July 2023.

References

Sources

External links
 
 
 

1977 films
1977 horror films
1970s ghost films
British ghost films
British haunted house films
British supernatural horror films
Canadian ghost films
Canadian supernatural horror films
English-language Canadian films
1970s English-language films
Filicide in fiction
Films about child death
Films about psychic powers
Films based on American horror novels
Films based on works by Peter Straub
Films directed by Richard Loncraine
Films scored by Colin Towns
Films set in London
Films shot in London
1970s Canadian films
1970s British films
1970s supernatural horror films